Yoʻldosh Aʼzamov (sometimes spelled Yuldash Agzamov in English) (May 10, 1909 – June 16, 1985) was an Uzbek actor, film director, playwright, screenwriter, and film producer. He is best known for his films Maftuningman (Delighted by You) (1958) and Oʻtgan kunlar (Days Gone By) (1967). Maftuningman is the first Uzbek comedy and is considered to be one of the greatest Uzbek films of all time.

Aʼzamov is widely regarded as one of the founders of the Uzbek film making industry. He received numerous honorary titles and awards during his lifetime, including the titles People's Artist of the Uzbek SSR (1970) and People's Artist of the USSR (1979).

Life and work 
Yoʻldosh Aʼzamov was born on May 10, 1909, in Tashkent. From 1926 until 1930, Aʼzamov acted at Sovkino and Vostokkino. Starting from 1930, he acted and directed films at Uzbekfilm. Aʼzamov died on June 16, 1985, at the age of 75. He was buried at Chigʻatoy Cemetery in Tashkent.

Aʼzamov is best known for his films Maftuningman (Delighted by You) (1958) and Oʻtgan kunlar (Days Gone By) (1967). Maftuningman is the first Uzbek comedy and is considered to be one of the greatest Uzbek films of all time.

Filmography

As director 
 Qilich (Russian: Клыч) (Qilich) (1934)
 Узбекский киноконцерт (Uzbek Cinema and Concert) (1941)
 Tohir va Zuhra (Tohir and Zuhra) (1945)
 Во имя счастья (In the Name of Happiness) (1956)
 Maftuningman (Russian: Очарован тобой) (Delighted by You) (1958)
 Рыбаки Арала (The Fishers of the Aral) (1958)
 Furqat (Russian: Фуркат) (Furqat) (1959)
 Отвергнутая невеста (The Rejected Bride) (1961)
 Дорога за горизонт (The Road Beyond the Horizon) (1963)
 Abdulla Nabiyev (Russian: Пятеро из Ферганы) (Abdulla Nabiyev) (1963)
 Листок из блокнота (A Page from a Notebook) (1965)
 Sayyod qoʻngʻirogʻi (Russian: Колокол Саята) (The Bell of Sayyod) (1966)
 Oʻtgan kunlar (Russian: Минувшие дни) (Days Gone By ) (1969)
 Olovli soʻqmoqlar (Russian: Горячие тропы) (The Fiery Paths) (1971)
 Mehrobdan chayon (Zulmatni tark etib) (Russian: Скорпион из алтаря (Побег из тьмы)) (Scorpion in the Pulpit (The Escape from Darkness)) (1973)
 Odamlar tashvishida (Russian: Ради других) (For Others) (1976)
 Ota nasihati (Russian: Отцовский наказ) (A Father's Advice) (1979)
 Katta va qisqa hayot (Russian: Большая короткая жизнь) (Big and Short Life) (1981)
 Пароль — «Отель Регина» (Uzbek: Parol — «Regina mehmonxonasi») (Password: The Hotel Regina) (1983)

As actor 
 Аня (Anya) (1927)
 Земля жаждет (Uzbek: Yer chanqogʻi) (The Earth's Thirst) (1930)
 Последний бек (The Last Bey) (1930)
 Yuksalish (Russian: Подъем) (The Ascent) (1931)
 Sayyod qoʻngʻirogʻi (Russian: Колокол Саята) (The Bell of Sayyod) (1966)
 Hayot tunda oʻtib ketdi (Russian: Парень и девушка) (1968)
 Oʻtgan kunlar (Russian: Минувшие дни) (Days Gone By ) (1969)
 Olovli soʻqmoqlar (Russian: Горячие тропы) (Hot Paths) (1971)

References

External links

1909 births
1985 deaths
People from Syr-Darya Oblast
Mass media people from Tashkent
People's Artists of the USSR
Soviet film directors
Soviet screenwriters
Male screenwriters
Uzbekistani film directors
Uzbekistani film producers
Uzbekistani male film actors
20th-century Uzbekistani male actors
20th-century screenwriters